Andrea Borella (born 23 June 1961) is an Italian fencer. His team won a gold medal in the team foil event at the 1984 Summer Olympics. Borella won European Championships in 1981 and 1983, as well as three World Cups. He is married to Francesca Bortolozzi, who was also an Olympic fencing champion for Italy.

References

External links
 
 

1961 births
Living people
Italian male fencers
Olympic fencers of Italy
Fencers at the 1984 Summer Olympics
Fencers at the 1988 Summer Olympics
Fencers at the 1992 Summer Olympics
Olympic gold medalists for Italy
Olympic medalists in fencing
Sportspeople from Venice
Medalists at the 1984 Summer Olympics
Universiade medalists in fencing
Universiade bronze medalists for Italy
Medalists at the 1983 Summer Universiade
People from Mestre-Carpenedo